The Pakistan Wrestling Federation (PWF) is the national governing body of wrestling in Pakistan. It is responsible for overseeing the freestyle, Greco-Roman, pankration, beach, and belt styles of wrestling. Women's wrestling is also overseen by the PWF.

The PWF was formed in Lahore in 1953. Muhammad Abdul Mobeen is the current president of the federation.

Affiliations 
The federation is affiliated with:
 United World Wrestling
 Asian Council of Associated Wrestling
 Pakistan Olympic Association
 Pakistan Sports Board

Affiliated associations 
 Balochistan
 Khyber Pakhtunkhwa
 Punjab
 Sindh
 Pakistan Army
 Pakistan WAPDA
 Pakistan Railways
 Pakistan Police
 Higher Education Commission (HEC)

National Championship 
The Pakistan Wrestling Championship organizes the National Wrestling Championship, with its first three editions being held in 1948, 1950, and 1952, respectively, even before the federation's inception. The most recent (65th) edition took place at the University of Veterinary and Animal Sciences, Lahore on 18 and 19 December 2021, with WAPDA retaining its title with seven gold and two silver medals, with Army and Railways finishing second and third, respectively.

Wrestling is also a regular part of the biannual National Games of Pakistan.

See also 
 Wrestling in Pakistan

References

External links
 Official website

Sports governing bodies in Pakistan
National members of the Asian Council of Associated Wrestling
Wrestling in Pakistan
1953 establishments in Pakistan
Sports organizations established in 1953